CML  may refer to:

Computing 
 Chemical Markup Language, a representation of chemistry using XML
 Column Managed Lengths, a representation of data in columns
 Concurrent Mapping and Localization, a technique for building and utilizing maps by autonomous robots
 Concurrent ML, a high-level language for concurrent programming
 Configuration Menu Language, a language and system for compiling the Linux kernel
 Conversation Markup Language, a language for building chatbots
 Coupled Map Lattices, an extended method of cellular automaton

Electronics 
 Current mode logic, a differential digital logic family
 Commercial microwave link, a communication channel between neighbouring towers in mobile networks

Organizations 
 Centre for Missional Leadership, the Watford campus of the London School of Theology
 Cinematography Mailing List, a long established and renowned website for professional cinematographers
 Classical Marimba League, an organization promoting the marimba, a percussion instrument
 CML - Institute of Environmental Sciences, an institute at Leiden University - the Netherlands
 Colorado Municipal League, see NLC members
 Columbus Metropolitan Library, one of the most used library systems in the United States
 Corpul Muncitoresc Legionar, a Romanian fascist workers' association
 Council of Mortgage Lenders, a trade association for the British mortgage lending industry

Science and medicine
 Chronic myelogenous leukemia, a blood cancer
 N(6)-Carboxymethyllysine, an advanced glycation end-product

Other uses 
 Camarillo (Amtrak station) (station code CML), a train station in California, United States
 Chiltern Main Line 
 Capital market line, the result when the market portfolio is combined with the risk-free asset
 Certified Master Locksmith, as awarded by the Associated Locksmiths of America
 950 in Roman numerals
 Camooweal Airport, IATA airport code "CML"

See also 
 A common mistyping of XML in computing